Chaturanga Lakmal Jayasooriya Arachchilage also known as Chathuranga Lakmal (born 7 October 1988) is a Sri Lankan male weightlifter.

Career 
He competed for Sri Lanka in the 2016 South Asian Games and claimed a silver medal in the men's 56 kg event.

He was named as one of the members of the Sri Lankan contingent at the 2018 Commonwealth Games. Chaturanga Lakmal also claimed the nation's first Commonwealth Games medal during the 2018 Commonwealth Games after clinching a bronze medal in the men's 56kg weightlifting event on the opening day of the competition. Later on the same day after Chaturanga Lakmal's bronze medal, Sri Lanka received another bronze medal in weightlifting with Dinusha Gomes claiming a bronze in the women's 58 kg weightlifting category, which was ultimately Sri Lanka's second medal at the Gold Coast Commonwealth Games. He is qualified to compete at the 2019 World Weightlifting Championships in the men's 61kg category.

Lakmal has qualified to compete for Sri Lanka at the 2022 Commonwealth Games in Birmingham, England.

References

External links

1988 births
Living people
Sri Lankan male weightlifters
Weightlifters at the 2018 Commonwealth Games
Commonwealth Games bronze medallists for Sri Lanka
Commonwealth Games medallists in weightlifting
People from Gampaha District
South Asian Games silver medalists for Sri Lanka
South Asian Games medalists in weightlifting
Weightlifters at the 2022 Commonwealth Games
20th-century Sri Lankan people
21st-century Sri Lankan people
Medallists at the 2018 Commonwealth Games